Dichelonyx is a genus of May beetles and junebugs in the family Scarabaeidae. There are at least 30 described species in Dichelonyx.

Selected species

References

Further reading

External links

 

Melolonthinae